Jens-Erik Madsen (born 30 March 1981) is a Danish former professional racing cyclist.

Major results

1999
 1st  Road race, National Junior Road Championships
2000
 National Track Championships
1st  Team pursuit
3rd Under-23 individual pursuit
2001
 3rd Team pursuit, National Track Championships
2002
 National Track Championships
2nd Madison
2nd Points race
2nd Under-23 individual pursuit
3rd Individual pursuit
3rd Team pursuit
 2nd Haderslev
 3rd Odder
2003
 1st Stage 5 Tour de Berlin
 National Track Championships
2nd Under-23 individual pursuit
3rd Madison
2004
 1st  Time trial, National Road Championships
 1st Overall Dan Bolig Cup
1st Stage 3
 1st Aarhus
 1st Horsens
 1st Padborg/Bov CC
 1st Viborg
 National Track Championships
2nd Individual pursuit
2nd Madison
3rd Points race
3rd Scratch
 2nd Overall Cup Danmark, Omnium
 3rd Madison, UEC European Track Championships
2005
 1st Overall Post Cup
 1st Overall Horsens
 1st GP Jægerspris
 1st Sorø
 1st Tønder
 1st Vejle
 2nd Hanstholm Post Cup
 2nd Kolding
 2nd Padborg/Bov CC
 3rd Madison, National Track Championships
2006
 1st Team pursuit, 2005–06 UCI Track Cycling World Cup Classics, Sydney
 2nd Team pursuit, 2006–07 UCI Track Cycling World Cup Classics, Sydney
 National Track Championships
2nd Team pursuit
3rd Individual pursuit
 2nd Kronborg
 2nd Tikøb
 3rd Scandinavian Open Road Race
2007
 1st  Time trial, National Road Championships
 1st Overall Cup Danmark, Omnium
 1st Randers
 1st Tønder
 2nd Team pursuit, 2006–07 UCI Track Cycling World Cup Classics, Los Angeles
 2nd Madison, National Track Championships
 3rd Team pursuit, UCI Track Cycling World Championships
 3rd Overall Post Cup
 3rd Aarhus GP
 3rd Padborg/Bov CC
2008
 2nd Team pursuit, Olympic Games
 2nd Team pursuit, UCI Track Cycling World Championships
 Team pursuit, 2007–08 UCI Track Cycling World Cup Classics
2nd Los Angeles
2nd Copenhagen
 2nd Team pursuit, 2008–09 UCI Track Cycling World Cup Classics, Manchester
2009
 1st  Team pursuit, UCI Track Cycling World Championships
 3rd Team pursuit, 2008–09 UCI Track Cycling World Cup Classics, Copenhagen

External links

1981 births
Living people
Danish male cyclists
Cyclists at the 2008 Summer Olympics
Olympic cyclists of Denmark
Olympic silver medalists for Denmark
Olympic medalists in cycling
Medalists at the 2008 Summer Olympics
Place of birth missing (living people)
UCI Track Cycling World Champions (men)
Danish track cyclists
People from Randers
Sportspeople from the Central Denmark Region